, also known as Chance: Pop Session, is a 2001 anime produced by Madhouse. The series aired from May 21 to August 27, 2001 and ran for 13 episodes.

Three young girls—Akari, Yuki, and Nozomi—meet at a concert and set out to follow in the footsteps of their idol, Reika, and become music stars. They enroll in the prestigious music school that produced Reika and are placed in the "S class" due to their potential.

While Chance Pop Session could be characterized as a romantic comedy in the shōjo category, it does have some elements of tragedy.

This is one of the few anime that for which ADV Films was on the production committee during their time in the anime industry. In the US, they released three volumes of videos on VHS and DVD in 2003. They also released a complete series thinpak on DVD in 2007 and a regular DVD case in 2009. It is currently streaming on Crunchyroll and HIDIVE.

Plot 

Three girls—Akari, Yuki, and Nozomi—meet each other at the concert of their idol, Reika. Each speaks to one another briefly, then goes their separate ways. They all love to sing, and when they each find admission forms for a music school overseen by Reika's manager, they do not hesitate to sign up. Reika's manager, Akiba Kisaragi, meanwhile, has decided to create a special class, the S Class, within the school for any singers who catch her eye.

Akari and Nozomi have no trouble signing up, and once there are nearly immediately accepted into the S Class, along with Jun Morimura. Akari and Nozomi recognize each other quickly and soon become close friends, but Jun keeps an aloof and superior attitude and students who were not selected for the S Class soon grow jealous. Yuki's hard-earned entrance money is stolen, and she joins a band of street musicians as a vocalist, soon becoming popular on the streets and online.

Characters 

Akari is one of the four members of Class S in the Chance Pop Session anime. She began her singing career as a member of church choir and she is the eldest of the three sisters. The "Mizu" in her name means water in English, which becomes significant later. She is voiced by Mayumi Iizuka in the Japanese and Kelli Cousins in the English dub.

Yuki is one of the four members of Class S in the Chance Pop Session anime and the middle sister of the trio. Her music career started as a street performer who was gaining a fan following before being recruited for Class S. The "Ao" in her name means blue in English, which becomes significant later. She is voiced by Atsuko Enomoto in the Japanese and Hilary Haag in the English dub.

Nozomi is one of the four members of Class S and the youngest sister in the Chance Pop Session anime. She began her singing career as a wealthy fan of Reika who wanted to attend the same school as she did. The "Kai" in her name means "ocean" in English, which becomes significant later. She is voiced by Maria Yamamoto in the Japanese and Monica Rial in the English dub.

Jun is a member of Class S in the Chance Pop Session anime. She believes that music and performing is all about competition and separates herself from the girls of R3, deciding to be a solo artist instead. She is voiced by Kana Ueda in the Japanese and Tiffany Grant in the English dub.

Reika was adopted by Kisaragi Akaba when she was around 10 years old. She had been abused by her show business mother, blaming Reika herself for being abused. When Kisaragi found her, they were both in need of each other. Kisaragi had lost many people close to her and was in a deep depression, whereas Reika needed a mother and Kisaragi's music helped her through her hard times. Once adopted by Kisaragi, Reika started singing and in no time she was a star like her adopted mother. When Kisaragi started her S-class and started looking for the next singing sensation though, Reika found herself a bit jealous. She is voiced by Mariko Kouda in the Japanese and Shelley Calene-Black in the English dub.

Kisaragi was a music superstar in her youth before becoming a singing coach. After being tragically separated from her three daughters, she adopted Reika and became her mentor. After deciding that Reika has learned all that she can from her, Kisaragi opens a music school and picks the best students for a special "Class S". She is voiced by Yuu Daiki in the Japanese and Christine Auten in the English dub.

Kaito is Akari's best friend and love interest. He encourages her to follow her dream of being a singer, and says he will race her to his own goal of becoming a teacher. He dies saving a child from being hit by a truck and becomes Akari's guardian angel. He is voiced by Takehito Koyasu in the Japanese and David Matranga in the English dub.

Episode list 
Note: Summaries shown are taken from HIDIVE's stream.

External links
 

2001 anime television series debuts
ADV Films
Madhouse (company)
Music in anime and manga
Romance anime and manga
Anime with original screenplays
Japanese idols in anime and manga